John O'Donovan may refer to: 
John O'Donovan (scholar) (1806–1861), Irish language scholar and place-name expert
John O'Donovan (politician) (1908–1982), Irish TD and Senator
John O'Donovan (police commissioner) (1858–1927), New Zealand police commissioner
John O'Donovan (Gaelic footballer) (1889–1920), Irish footballer 
John O'Donovan, guitarist with The Adolescents punk band

See also
John Donovan (disambiguation)